Canadian Catholic News (CCN) is a co-operative news service serving Catholic media across Canada, bringing together the efforts of Catholic newspapers, radio and television across Canada. Its goal is to provide an accurate, dependable coast-to-coast picture of the Catholic Church in action.

Members
 The B.C. Catholic
 Grandin Media formerly Western Catholic Reporter
 Prairie Messenger
 The Catholic Register
 Catholic New Times
 The Catholic Times
 The New Freeman
 The Atlantic Catholic

Catholic media